Kezie Uchechukwu Duru Akabusi , MBE (born 28 November 1958), known as Kriss Akabusi, is a British former sprint and hurdling track and field athlete.

His first international successes were with the British 4×400 metres relay team, winning a silver medal at the 1984 Summer Olympics, golds at the 1986 Commonwealth Games and 1986 European Athletics Championships, and another silver at the 1987 World Championships in Athletics. He progressed individually in 400 metres hurdles from the late 1980s onwards, taking bronze at the 1989 IAAF World Cup. His time of 47.93 seconds to win the 1990 European Athletics Championships was a British record, and he also won gold at the 1990 Commonwealth Games.

He reached the peak of his career over the next two years, winning a hurdles bronze medal at the 1991 World Championships and anchoring the British team to a narrow victory over the American team in 2:57.53 minutes – a British record for the 4 × 400 m relay. He followed this with a British 400 m hurdles record of 47.82 seconds to take the bronze medal at the 1992 Barcelona Olympics, where he also won bronze with the 4×400 m relay team. Since retiring from athletics, he has worked as a television presenter and motivational speaker.

Early life
Born in Paddington to Nigerian parents who were studying in London, Akabusi would later be brought up in foster care with his brother Riba, after their parents returned to their country when he was four. Due to the outbreak of the Nigerian Civil War in 1967, Akabusi was unable to stay in contact with his parents, although he would later be reunited with his mother in his teens. She was determined that her son should settle in Nigeria, but while Akabusi was keen to make up for lost time with the rest of his family, he remained in the United Kingdom, eventually visiting the African nation when he was twenty-one. He attended Edmonton County School.

It was during this time that Akabusi, who is of Igbo heritage, changed his first name from 'Kezie' to 'Kriss'. He told an interviewer in 2002: "I decided to make a new start and part of that new start was to have a new name. I spelt my name with a 'K' because I didn't want to change my initials and I want to have some connections with my past. Kezie Akabusi was the connection to my past, but Kriss Akabusi is a connection with my future."

Military career
Akabusi joined the British Army in 1975, having a career in the Royal Corps of Signals before switching to the Army Physical Training Corps (as it was then called) in 1981. In 1990, when he was discharged into the reserves at the end of his army career he held the rank of Warrant Officer Class 2. It was during his tenure in the military that his potential in sports was discovered.

Athletics career

In 1983, Akabusi embarked upon an athletics career, initially specialising in the 400 metres, before switching to the 400 metres hurdles in 1987. As a member of the British 4 × 400 m relay team, Akabusi won a silver medal at the 1984 Olympic Games in Los Angeles.

In 1990, Akabusi broke David Hemery's longstanding British 400 m hurdles record of 48.12 seconds on his way to a gold medal at the European Championships, with a time of 47.93 seconds. He also won the 400 m hurdles gold medal at that year's Commonwealth Games.

At the 1991 World Championships in Tokyo, Akabusi won the bronze medal in the 400 m hurdles and a gold medal as a member of the 4 x 400 relay team alongside Roger Black, Derek Redmond and John Regis, with Akabusi as anchor leg. At the start of the final lap, he took the baton in second place behind the American team, but eventually overtook American runner Antonio Pettigrew (who had won the 400 m individual event) on the final straight and crossed the line in first place to win the gold medal for Britain in a time of 2:57.53, a new British record.

At the 1992 Olympic Games in Barcelona Akabusi won the bronze medal in the 400 m hurdles, lowering his British record to 47.82 seconds, a time which still stands. This was the same race in which Kevin Young set the former world record. He also won a bronze in the 4 × 400 m relay.

Television work
Following his retirement from sports, Akabusi became a television presenter, working on several shows including Record Breakers (joining after the death of long-serving presenter Roy Castle in 1994) and The Big Breakfast, and regularly appeared as a panelist on many quiz shows such as A Question of Sport, They Think It's All Over and Through the Keyhole.  In 1997 he appeared as a milkman on Last of the Summer Wine in the episode "There Goes the Groom".

Other appearances include: Come Dine with Me in 2011; in an Olympic-themed advert for Nature Valley cereal bars in 2012; a cameo in a red button episode of EastEnders; The Big Fat Quiz of The 80's; A League of Their Own; Never Mind The Buzzcocks and Backchat.

In 2017, Akabusi became a commentator on ITV's Bigheads with Jenny Powell. He also featured on the fifth series of Big Star's Little Star with his son Alanam. Since 2018 he has regularly appeared in adverts for Ladbrokes online betting.

Honours
In 1991 it was announced that he would be appointed a Member of the Order of the British Empire by Queen Elizabeth II in recognition of his services to the country through athletics. In 1992 he was awarded an honorary degree from the University of Southampton.

Political views
In 1998, Akabusi discussed voting for the Conservative Party. In 2011, he supported the 'Yes' side in the Alternative Vote referendum. In August 2014, he was one of 200 public figures who signed a letter to The Guardian expressing their hope that Scotland would vote to remain part of the United Kingdom in September's referendum on that issue.

International competitions
1984
Summer Olympics - Los Angeles, United States.
4 x 400 m. relay silver medal
1986
Commonwealth Games - Edinburgh, Scotland.
4 x 400 m. relay gold medal
1987
World Championships - Rome, Italy.
4 x 400 m. relay silver medal
1989
IAAF World Cup - Barcelona, Spain.
400 m. hurdles bronze medal
European Cup - Gateshead, England.
400 m. hurdles gold medal
1990
Commonwealth Games - Auckland, New Zealand.
400 m. hurdles gold medal
European Championships- Split, Yugoslavia.
400 m. hurdles gold medal
1991
World Championships - Tokyo, Japan.
400 m. hurdles bronze medal
4 x 400 m. relay gold medal
European Cup - Frankfurt am Main, Germany.
400 m. hurdles gold medal
1992
Summer Olympics: Barcelona, Spain.
400 m. hurdles bronze medal
4 × 400 m. relay bronze medal

References

External links
 United Kingdom Athletics profile for Kriss Akabusi
 
 Guardian interview, 12 August 2008
 London Student Newspaper coverage of the UCLU bar re-naming

1958 births
Military personnel from London
Living people
People from Paddington
Athletes from London
British male sprinters
English male hurdlers
English male sprinters
English television presenters
Olympic athletes of Great Britain
Olympic silver medallists for Great Britain
Olympic bronze medallists for Great Britain
Olympic silver medalists in athletics (track and field)
Olympic bronze medalists in athletics (track and field)
Athletes (track and field) at the 1984 Summer Olympics
Athletes (track and field) at the 1988 Summer Olympics
Athletes (track and field) at the 1992 Summer Olympics
Medalists at the 1984 Summer Olympics
Medalists at the 1992 Summer Olympics
English Olympic medallists
Commonwealth Games gold medallists for England
Commonwealth Games medallists in athletics
Athletes (track and field) at the 1990 Commonwealth Games
World Athletics Championships athletes for Great Britain
World Athletics Championships medalists
European Athletics Championships medalists
Members of the Order of the British Empire
Black British sportsmen
English people of Nigerian descent
English people of Igbo descent
Igbo sportspeople
People educated at Edmonton County School
Royal Corps of Signals soldiers
Royal Army Physical Training Corps soldiers
World Athletics Championships winners
20th-century British Army personnel
Medallists at the 1990 Commonwealth Games